Jangaleh-ye Olya (also Romanized as Jangaleh-ye ‘Olyā; also known as Jangeh and Jangeh-ye ‘Olyā) is a village in Dasht-e Hor Rural District, in the Central District of Salas-e Babajani County, Kermanshah Province, Iran. At the 2006 census, its population was 77, in 17 families.

References 

Populated places in Salas-e Babajani County